Three Cheers for the Irish is a 1940 comedy film directed by Lloyd Bacon, written by Richard Macaulay and Jerry Wald, and starring Priscilla Lane, Thomas Mitchell and Dennis Morgan.  The supporting cast features Virginia Grey, Alan Hale, Sr. and William Lundigan. The plot involves a veteran police officer (Mitchell) forced into retirement only to learn that his replacement (Morgan), whom he detests, is romancing his daughter (Lane). The film was released by Warner Bros. on March 16, 1940.

Plot
Peter Casey is an Irish policeman in NYC with twenty five years on the force. He has three daughters Maureen, Pat, and Heloise. Maureen meets and falls in love with a Scottish policeman Augus Ferguson, Pat dates Ed Mckean,  a wreaking supervisor who bores Peter and is a cheapskate,and Heloise  who keeps time with a noted gambler- Joe Niklas. Peter unexpectedly gets retired after 25 years on the force and has to train Augus as his replacement to his disgust.  Peter's police buddies buy him a rocking chair. In his retirement he get bored and has to deal with a overbearing friend,Gallagher. Worse Augus has been dating Maureen behind his back. They even get married but keep it a secret. Over time Peter’s friends run him for Alderman and despite  Gallagher’s overbearing help he wins the election. Peter, daughter and son-in-law work things when Maureen get pregnant. Angus chases Peter when as a good Catholic and Irishman runs looking for a priest to make the wedding official.

Cast
Priscilla Lane as Maureen Casey
Thomas Mitchell as Peter Casey
Dennis Morgan as Angus Ferguson
Virginia Grey as Patricia Casey
Irene Hervey as Heloise Casey
Alan Hale, Sr. as Gallagher
William Lundigan as Michael Flaherty
Frank Jenks as Ed McKean
Henry Armetta as Tony
Morgan Conway as Joe Niklas
Alec Craig as Callaghan
J. M. Kerrigan as Scanlon
Cliff Clark as Mara
William B. Davidson as Police Commissioner 
Joe King as Police Captain

References

External links
 
 

1940 films
1940 romantic comedy films
American black-and-white films
American romantic comedy films
Films directed by Lloyd Bacon
Films produced by Samuel Bischoff
Films scored by Adolph Deutsch
Warner Bros. films
1940s English-language films
1940s American films